Halina Bielińska (August 14, 1914 in Warsaw - October 13, 1989 in Warsaw) was a Polish film director, animator and screenwriter.

Halina Bielińska and  Włodzimierz Haupe were among the first Polish animators; their film Zmiana warty (Changing of the Guard) was awarded the  Short Film Prize at the Cannes Film Festival in 1959.

Selected filmography
Feature Films
 Szczęściarz Antoni (1961) 
 Godzina pąsowej róży (1963)
 Sam pośród miasta (1965)
 The Nutcracker (Dziadek do orzechów) (1967)
 Piąta rano (1969)
Animated Films
 Katarynka (1956)
 Zmiana warty (1958)
 But (1959)

References

External links

Halina Bielińska WIEM Encyklopedia 

1914 births
1989 deaths
Polish women film directors
Polish film directors
Polish women screenwriters
Film people from Warsaw
20th-century Polish screenwriters